The football tournament at the 2009 East Asian Games was held from 2 December 2009 to 13 December 2009. Hosts Hong Kong defeated Japan 4–2 in a penalty shoot-out in the final after a 1–1 draw to win their first-ever international title, while South Korea beat North Korea with the same score to finish third.

Venues
All group stage matches were held at Siu Sai Wan Sports Ground. The semi-finals, third place play-off and final were held at Hong Kong Stadium.

Calendar
A total of 6 teams took part in the tournament. Group stage matches commenced on 2 December 2009, three days before the opening ceremony. The teams were divided into two groups each consisting of three teams for a round-robin group stage. The top two teams in each pool would advance to a four-team single-elimination bracket.

Squads

Each team submitted a squad of 23 players, including three goalkeepers. At previous tournaments, the age limit was set at 23 with three overage players allowed. However, restrictions were lifted in 2009.

The South Korean team was selected from the semi-professional Korea National League, while China PR and Japan sent U-20 teams. Hong Kong sent their U-23 team, with the exception of four players who were above 23.

Group stage

Group A

Group B

Knockout stage

Semi-finals

Bronze medal match

Gold medal match

Medalists

References

External links
 Football in Hong Kong 2009 East Asian Games Official Website
 Group A Score Table in HKFA Website
 Group B Score Table in HKFA Website

2009
2009–10 in Hong Kong football
football
2009
2009 in Asian football
2009 in Japanese football
2009 in North Korean football
2009 in South Korean football
2009 in Chinese football
2009 in Macau football